Jaraíz de la Vera is a municipality located in the province of Cáceres, Extremadura, Spain. According to the 2012 census (INE), the municipality has a population of 6727 inhabitants. It is situated to the north of Extremadura and it is the capital city of the comarca La Vera.

From 1964 to 1991 the town was home to "The Institute of Studies on Ancient Weapons" which was part of the Higher Council for Scientific Research. The institute was led by Ada Bruhn Hoffmeyer and her husband.

References

Municipalities in the Province of Cáceres